Garikai N. Mutasa (born 1952) is a Zimbabwean novelist. His novel The Contact (1985) is a victory story of the Zanla guerrillas, based on Soviet socialist-realism models.  He previously trained as a teacher at Gweru Teacher's College

References

1952 births
Living people
Male novelists
Zimbabwean male writers
Zimbabwean novelists